The Miles Goodyear Cabin is a historic building in Ogden, Utah, built by trapper and trader Miles Goodyear on the Weber River in 1845 and was the foundation of the first permanent European settlement in Utah. It is the oldest building in the state of Utah not built by Native Americans.

History
The cabin was built in 1845 by Miles Goodyear at a location he called Fort Buenaventura. The fort also included a stockade, garden, and fruit trees. In 1847 the fort was sold to Mormon settlers, along with livestock and the surrounding area for $1,950 (equivalent to about $ in ). In the 1850s the cabin was sold and moved. It was moved several more times during the next 50 years to various locations along Washington Avenue in Ogden.

In 1919 it was donated to the Daughters of Utah Pioneers and was displayed on a parade float. It was then moved to a location behind Fire Station #3 (also on Washington Avenue). In 1928 it was moved to Tabernacle Square next to the Daughters of Utah Pioneers Museum. It was moved again in 2011-2012, along with the museum to a lot on the corner of 21st and Lincoln Avenue, as part of the remodel of the Ogden Utah Temple.

The cabin was placed on the National Register of Historic Places in 1971. The submission paperwork notes that the roof is not original, and some of the logs were replaced after they had rotted.

During 1994-1995 the cabin was refurbished. It was dismantled, the logs were treated with a preservative, and it was reassembled.

References

External links

Houses on the National Register of Historic Places in Utah
Houses completed in 1845
Historic American Buildings Survey in Utah
Log cabins in the United States
Buildings and structures in Ogden, Utah
Houses in Weber County, Utah
National Register of Historic Places in Weber County, Utah
Log buildings and structures on the National Register of Historic Places in Utah
Relocated buildings and structures in Utah
1845 establishments in Mexico
Pre-statehood history of Utah